The Convent of Madres Reparadoras (Spanish: Convento de las Madres Reparadoras) is a convent located in Madrid, Spain. It was declared Bien de Interés Cultural in 1979.

References 

Convents in Spain
Buildings and structures in Chamartín District, Madrid
Bien de Interés Cultural landmarks in Madrid